Marcel Duijn (born 12 May 1977) is a Dutch former cyclist, who competed as a professional from 2000 to 2002 with . He rode in the 2000 Giro d'Italia and the 2001 Paris–Roubaix. In 1999, he won the Gerrie Knetemann Trofee for the best under-23 Dutch cyclist.

Major results

1997
 2nd Overall Tour de Liège
1st Stage 4
1998
 National Under-23 Road Championships
1st  Time trial
2nd Road race
 1st Overall Le Triptyque des Monts et Châteaux
1st Stage 2
 1st Tour Beneden-Maas
 2nd Overall Olympia's Tour
 3rd Ronde van Overijssel
1999
 1st Overall Olympia's Tour
1st Stage 10 (ITT)
 1st Circuit de Wallonie
 4th Overall Le Triptyque des Monts et Châteaux
2000
 4th Time trial, National Road Championships
 6th Veenendaal–Veenendaal
 10th Le Samyn
2001
 10th Overall Tour de Luxembourg
2002
 4th Time trial, National Road Championships
 5th Overall Niedersachsen-Rundfahrt

References

External links

1977 births
Living people
Dutch male cyclists
People from Heemskerk
Cyclists from North Holland